Euconulus is a genus of very small air-breathing land snails, terrestrial pulmonate gastropod mollusks in the family Euconulidae, the hive snails.

Species 
Species within the genus Euconulus include:
 Euconulus alderi (Gray, 1840)
 † Euconulus alveolus (F. Sandberger, 1887) 
 Euconulus chersinus (Say, 1821)
 Euconulus conoides H. B. Baker, 1941
 Euconulus crami Fischer-Piette, Blanc, C.P., Blanc, F. & Salvat, 1994
 Euconulus dentatus (Sterki, 1893)
 Euconulus deroni Fischer-Piette, Blanc, C.P., Blanc, F. & Salvat, 1994
 Euconulus fresti Horsáková, Nekola & Horsák, 2020
 Euconulus fulvus (O. F. Müller, 1774)
 Euconulus gaetanoi (Pilsbry & Vanatta, 1908)
 Euconulus konaensis (Sykes, 1896)
 Euconulus lubricella (Ancey, 1904)
 Euconulus martinezi (Hidalgo, 1869)
 Euconulus microsoma (Morelet, 1883)
Euconulus pittieri (Martens, 1892)
 Euconulus polygyratus (Pilsbry, 1899)
 † Euconulus styriacus Harzhauser, Neubauer & H. Binder, 2014
 Euconulus subtilissimus (A. Gould, 1847)
 Euconulus thaanumi (Ancey, 1904)
 Euconulus thurstoni H. B. Baker, 1941
 Euconulus trochiformis (Montagu, 1803)
 Euconulus trochulus (O. W. H. Reinhardt, 1883)
 Euconulus turbinatus Gulick, 1904
Species brought into synonymy
 Euconulus alveus F. Sandberger, 1887 † : synonym of Euconulus alveolus (F. Sandberger, 1887) † (incorrect subsequent spelling)
 Euconulus callopisticus (Bourguignat, 1880) : synonym of Euconulus fulvus fulvus (O. F. Müller, 1774) (junior synonym)
 Euconulus kaliellaeformis (Klebs, 1886) † : synonym of Kaliella kaliellaeformis (Klebs, 1886) †
 Euconulus mcleodensis Russell, 1929 † : synonym of Grangerella mcleodensis (Russell, 1929) † (new combination)
 Euconulus micra (Morelet, 1882) : synonym of Euconulus crami Fischer-Piette, Blanc, C.P., Blanc, F. & Salvat, 1994 (junior homonym)
 Euconulus praticola (O. W. H. Reinhardt, 1883) : synonym of Euconulus alderi (Gray, 1840) (junior synonym)
 Euconulus reinhardti Pilsbry, 1900 : synonym of Parasitala reinhardti (Pilsbry, 1900) (original combination)
 Euconulus trochiformis (Montagu, 1803) : synonym of Euconulus fulvus fulvus (O. F. Müller, 1774) (junior synonym)

References

 Reinhardt, O. (1883). Einige von Herrn D. W. Kobelt in Schwanheim a. M. zur Begutachtung übersandte, von Herrn Hungerford gesammelte japanische Hyalinen. Sitzungs-Berichte der Gesellschaft Naturforschender Freunde zu Berlin, 1883: 82-86. Berlin.
 Bourguignat, J.-R. (1891). Des formes européennes trocho-hyalinoïdes classées jusqu'à présent sous le nom générique de Conulus. Bulletins de la Société Malacologique de France, 7: 325-338, pl. 8. Paris

External links
 AnimalBase info discussing the taxonomy of Euconulus 
 Iredale, T. (1933). Systematic notes on Australian land shells. Records of the Australian Museum. 19(1): 37-59
  Baker, H. B. (1941). Zonitid snails from Pacific islands. Part 3 and 4. Bernice P. Bishop Museum Bulletin. 166: 203–370.
 Fitzinger, L.J. (1833). Systematisches Verzeichniß der im Erzherzogthume Oesterreich vorkommenden Weichthiere, als Prodrom einer Fauna derselben. Beiträge zur Landeskunde Oesterreichs's unter der Enns, 3: 88-122. Wien

Euconulidae